Eileen Marguerite McNenemy (8 February 1938 – 28 July 2004) professionally known as Margo McLennan, she was also billed in her early acting career as Margo Mayne and briefly as Margot McLennan and  Marco McLennan, was a British-born actress , singer and dancer who was active in England and Australia, where she became best known to international audiences for her role in the Australian TV cult soap opera Prisoner,  (known in United States and UK as Prisoner: Cell Block H and Caged Woman in Canada)

Biography

Born in Peckham, South London, to a father who was a licensed virtualler and professional violinist and a mother who dabbled in real estate speculation, she originally trained to be an ice skater at the Streatham Ice and Leisure Centre, before deciding instead a career as an actress, having trained in the arts at the Italia Conti Academy. her career spanned some 50 years.

One of the most popular actresses of the 1960s she was a theatre, film and TV star, who appeared on magazine covers and in commercials, after being spotted as a dancer in cabaret, she appeared in such stage roles as The Merchant of Venice and Goodnight Mrs. Puffin, the latter which marked her debut in West End theatre

She was married to fellow actor Tony Doonan from 1962 until their divorce in 1969. They had one child, Nicola, from that union. She changed her name to Margo Mayne.
 
In the 1960s and early 1970s she appeared in several British screen roles including Spaceflight IC-1 and  Love Is a Splendid Illusion as well as numerous TV series including Night Train to Surbiton and Ransom For A Pretty Girl. She went on to play a succession of glamorous characters in shows such as The Gentle Killers, Motive for Murder and Man from Interpol.

Having moved to Australia, Margo joined the cult series Prisoner in 1979 as Catherine Roberts, in a controversial storyline where she is sent to prison for killing her daughter's rapist. During 1982 she returned to the show for a three episode guest role of Prison Officer Parsons.
 
After Prisoner she took guest roles in numerous TV  series The Flying Doctors, A Country Practice,  Blue Heelers and The Secret Life of Us.

In later life, under the name Margo Lady McLennen, she was an advocate for gay and lesbian marriage, and was a celebrant. Upon learning she had cancer, she returned to Britain with her second husband, Australian actor Rodney McLennan.

McLennan's final acting role was in Prisoner Queen (2003), playing Mrs. Gelding. She died in West Sussex, Britain from metastasised cancer, aged 66.

Filmography

References

External links

1938 births
2004 deaths
Actresses from London
English film actresses
English television actresses
English soap opera actresses
Australian film actresses
Australian soap opera actresses
Deaths from cancer in England
20th-century Australian actresses
20th-century English actresses
21st-century Australian actresses
21st-century English actresses